News@12 is the defunct daily newscast of the Sonshine Media Network International with the latest national, local & international news, business news & sports news and its anchored by Troy Gomez.

Reporters
Jade Cleaveland
Rachelle Dueñas
Jeremiah Pancho

See also
Sonshine Media Network International

Sonshine Media Network International
Philippine television news shows
Television in Davao City